Kevin Pope may refer to:

 Kevin Pope (cartoonist) (born 1958), whose work has appeared in MAD Magazine
 Kevin O. Pope, former NASA archaeologist and founder of Geo Eco Arch Research